Earl of Deloraine was a title in the Peerage of Scotland. It was created in 1706 for Lord Henry Scott, second surviving son of James Scott, 1st Duke of Monmouth (illegitimate son of King Charles II by his mistress Lucy Walter) by Anne Scott, 1st Duchess of Buccleuch. He was made Lord Goldielands and Viscount of Hermitage at the same time, also in the Peerage of Scotland. Two of his sons, the second and third Earls, succeeded in the title. The titles became extinct on the death of the latter's son, the fourth Earl, in 1807.

The titles come from places in the Scottish Borders: Deloraine is where the Deloraine Burn joins the Ettrick Water, between Ettrick and Ettrickbridge; Hermitage Castle is north of Newcastleton; and Goldielands is a peel tower near where the Borthwick Water joins the River Teviot, to the southwest of Hawick.

Earls of Deloraine (1706)
Henry Scott, 1st Earl of Deloraine (1676–1730)
Francis Scott, 2nd Earl of Deloraine (1710–1739)
Henry Scott, 3rd Earl of Deloraine (1712–1740)
Henry Scott, 4th Earl of Deloraine (1737–1807)

Arms

See also
Duke of Monmouth
Duke of Buccleuch

References

Extinct earldoms in the Peerage of Scotland
Noble titles created in 1706